The John R. Nelson House is a historic house located at 4 Brunswick Street in Quincy, Massachusetts.

Description and history 
The -story timber-framed house was built in 1908 as a summer house by John R. Nelson, who was one of the developers of the Squantum farms. It is one of the area's best-preserved Craftsman/Bungalow homes. It has a side gable roof with broad eaves showing exposed rafter ends, which also extends over the front porch, where it is supported by stone piers.

The house was listed on the National Register of Historic Places on September 20, 1989.

Gallery

See also
National Register of Historic Places listings in Quincy, Massachusetts

References

Houses completed in 1908
Houses in Quincy, Massachusetts
National Register of Historic Places in Quincy, Massachusetts
Houses on the National Register of Historic Places in Norfolk County, Massachusetts
1908 establishments in Massachusetts
Bungalow architecture in Massachusetts
American Craftsman architecture in Massachusetts